Change Has Come is the second EP by the Screaming Trees. It was the only recording the band released through Sub Pop.  After its 1990 release, the Screaming Trees moved on to a major label, Epic Records, for their next three albums - Uncle Anesthesia, Sweet Oblivion, and Dust, as well as the Something About Today EP. The album's cover art was photographed by Charles Peterson.

Drummer Mark Pickerel described the EP as "our best recorded moment"

Track listing

Personnel
Screaming Trees
 Mark Lanegan – lead vocals
 Gary Lee Conner – guitar, trumpet
 Van Conner – bass, backing vocals
 Mark Pickerel – percussion, drums

Additional
 Steve Fisk – producer
 Jack  Endino – producer
 Charles Peterson – photography
 Carol Hibbs – mastering

References

Screaming Trees albums
1990 EPs
Grunge EPs
Sub Pop EPs